Scelodonta wittei is a species of leaf beetle. It is distributed in the Republic of the Congo, the Democratic Republic of the Congo, Sudan, Ethiopia, Somalia, Eritrea and Ivory Coast. It was first described by the Belgian entomologist  in 1942, from specimens collected by Gaston-François de Witte from the Albert National Park between 1933 and 1935.

References

Eumolpinae
Beetles of the Democratic Republic of the Congo
Insects of the Republic of the Congo
Insects of Sudan
Insects of Ethiopia
Insects of Somalia
Insects of Eritrea
Insects of West Africa
Beetles described in 1942